RoboCop 3 is a 1993 American science fiction film directed by Fred Dekker and written by Dekker and Frank Miller. It is the sequel to the 1990 film RoboCop 2 and the third entry in the RoboCop franchise. It stars Robert Burke, Nancy Allen and Rip Torn. Set in the near future in a dystopian metropolitan Detroit, Michigan, the plot centers around RoboCop (Burke) as he vows to avenge the death of his partner Anne Lewis (Allen) and save Detroit from falling into chaos, while evil conglomerate OCP, run by its CEO (Torn), advances its program to demolish the city and build a new "Delta City" over the former homes of the residents. It was filmed in Atlanta, Georgia. Most of the buildings seen in the film were slated for demolition to make way for facilities for the 1996 Summer Olympics that were held in the city.

RoboCop 3 is the first film to use digital morphing in more than one scene. The film was a critical and commercial failure in the US, grossing $47 million worldwide against its $22 million budget, making it the least profitable film of the RoboCop franchise. The two television series, RoboCop and RoboCop: Prime Directives, were released in 1994 and 2001, while a remake RoboCop was released in 2014.

Plot
In a dystopian future, the conglomerate Omni Consumer Products (OCP) have succeeded in their plan from prior films and have acquired the city of Detroit via bankruptcy, but are now struggling with their plans to create the new Delta City. The Delta City dream of the now-deceased OCP CEO lives on with the help of the Japanese Kanemitsu Corporation, which has bought a controlling stake in OCP and is trying to finance the plan.  Kanemitsu, CEO of the Kanemitsu Corporation, proceeds with the plans to remove the current citizens in order to create Delta City, but is doubtful about the competence of his new "partners". 
Due to passive resistance by the Detroit Police Department toward mass eviction, OCP creates a heavily armed private security force called the Urban Rehabilitators, nicknamed "Rehabs", under the command of Paul McDaggett, to forcibly relocate the evicted citizens such as the residents of the now condemned Cadillac Heights. Nikko Halloran, a young resident of Cadillac Heights skilled with computers, loses her parents in the relocation process.

RoboCop and his partner Anne Lewis try to defend civilians from the Rehabs one night, but McDaggett mortally wounds Lewis, who eventually dies. Unable to fight back because of his "Fourth Directive" programming, RoboCop is saved by members of a resistance movement composed of Nikko and residents from Cadillac Heights and he eventually joins them. Because he was severely damaged during the shoot-out, RoboCop's systems efficiency plummets, and he asks the resistance to summon Dr. Marie Lazarus, one of the scientists who created him. Upon arrival she begins to treat him, deleting the Fourth Directive in the process. During an earlier raid on an armory, the resistance picked up a jet-pack prototype, originally intended for RoboCop's use, which Lazarus modifies and upgrades to hold RoboCop.

After recovering from his injuries, RoboCop conducts a one-man campaign against the Rehabs and OCP. He finds McDaggett and attempts to subdue him. However, McDaggett successfully escapes and then obtains information from a disgruntled resistance member about where the resistance fighters' base is located. CEO Kanemitsu has developed his own ninja androids called "Otomo" and sends one to assist McDaggett overcome the resistance of anti-OCP militia forces. The Rehabs attack and most of the resistance members are either killed or taken prisoner. When RoboCop returns to the rebel base to find it abandoned, one Otomo unit arrives and attacks him. RoboCop experiences another power drain and his left arm and auto gun is destroyed, but eventually he successfully overcomes his opponent with his arm-mounted gun. Nikko infiltrates the OCP building and assists a captured Lazarus in broadcasting an improvised video, revealing OCP as responsible for the city's high crime rates and incriminating them for removing and killing the Cadillac Heights residents. The broadcast causes OCP's stock to plunge, financially ruining and bankrupting the company.

Meanwhile, McDaggett decides to execute an all-out strike against Cadillac Heights with the help of the Detroit police, but the police officers, enraged at the company's callous ways, refuse to comply and instead defect to the resistance, escalating the rebellion against OCP into a full-scale war. As a result, McDaggett turns to hiring street gangs and hooligans to assist with his plans.

Having heard Lazarus' broadcast, RoboCop provides aerial support for the entrenched resistance forces. He then proceeds to the OCP building and confronts the waiting McDaggett. RoboCop is then attacked, and nearly defeated, by two Otomo robots. Nikko and Lazarus succeed in reprogramming them using a wireless link from a laptop computer, having them attack each other. The Otomos' self-destruct system activates, forcing RoboCop to flee with Nikko and Lazarus. The flaming discharge from the jetpack immobilizes McDaggett, leaving him to perish in the blast.

As Old Detroit is being cleaned up, Kanemitsu arrives and finally comes face to face with RoboCop along with his group, while his translator tells the OCP president on Kanemitsu's behalf that he is fired, as the corporation shuts down OCP for good and plans to leave Detroit. Kanemitsu then bows to RoboCop and the group in respect. The CEO compliments RoboCop and asks for his name, to which he responds with, "My friends call me Murphy. You call me RoboCop."

Cast

Production

Development and writing

The film was directed by Fred Dekker, a director primarily known for cult horror films (Night of the Creeps, The Monster Squad). Comic author Frank Miller, who co-wrote RoboCop 2, returned to write the screenplay for the film. Still optimistic that he could make an impression in Hollywood, Miller hoped that some of his ideas excised from RoboCop 2 would make it into RoboCop 3. Major themes of the plot were taken from Miller's original (rejected) draft of RoboCop 2. Disillusioned after finding that his work was even more drastically altered, Miller left Hollywood until the 2005 adaptation of his work Sin City. “[Working on RoboCop 2 and 3] I learned the same lesson,” Miller said in 2005. “Don’t be the writer. The director’s got the power. The screenplay is a fire hydrant, and there’s a row of dogs around the block waiting for it." Miller's original screenplay for RoboCop 2, and source for major ideas in RoboCop 3, was later turned into a nine-part comic book series called Frank Miller's RoboCop. Boom Studios released an eight-part comic book series Robocop: The Last Stand which is based on Miller's original Robocop 3 screenplay.

Casting
The star of the previous films, Peter Weller, did not reprise the role of RoboCop, as he was starring in Naked Lunch. Robert John Burke was signed to play the cyborg character instead. The RoboCop suit Burke wore in the movie was originally built for RoboCop 2 (1990). Burke often complained that wearing it was painful after a short time.

Recognizing that RoboCop's fan base consisted primarily of children, Orion Pictures cut down on the graphic violence that was seen as the defining characteristic of the first two films.

Pre-production
RoboCop 3 went into production soon after RoboCop 2 was complete. Initially scheduled for release in the summer of 1992, RoboCop 3 would languish on the shelf until the following year as Orion Pictures went through bankruptcy and was bought out. Because of release delays, its tie-in video game was released prior to the film, and thus revealed the film's plot beforehand.

Music
After RoboCop 2s score which was composed by Leonard Rosenman, the RoboCop original composer Basil Poledouris returned to compose the soundtrack score and brought back many of the RoboCop themes from the original film.

Reception

Box office
RoboCop 3 opened at number one in Japan, grossing 147,695,744 yen ($1.3 million) in its opening week from 17 screens, and went on to gross over $10 million there. It also opened at number one in France with a gross of 9.6 million French franc ($1.7 million) from 317 screens. In the US, it grossed $4.3 million in its opening weekend from 1,796 theaters, placing third, ending its run with $10.6 million in the United States and Canada. Internationally, it grossed $36.3 million for a worldwide gross of $47 million, against an estimated $22 million production budget.

Critical response
The film received negative reviews from critics, and is often considered to be the worst entry of the series. Rotten Tomatoes gives RoboCop 3 a score of 6% based on 32 reviews, with an average score of 3.20/10. The website's critical consensus states, "This asinine sequel should be placed under arrest." Metacritic rates it 40 out of 100 based on 15 critic reviews, indicating "mixed or average reviews".

Richard Harrington from The Washington Post said the movie is "hardly riveting and often it's downright silly. The sets and effects betray their downsized budget."

Chicago Sun Times critic Roger Ebert gave the film one and a half stars, disputing the characters' longevity. "Why do they persist in making these retreads? Because RoboCop is a brand name, I guess, and this is this year's new model. It's an old tradition in Detroit to take an old design and slap on some fresh chrome."

David Nusair from Reel Film Reviews gave the film two and a half stars, stating, "The best one could hope for is a movie that's not an ordeal to sit through, and on that level, RoboCop 3 certainly excels. When placed side-by-side with the original, the film doesn't quite hold up. But, at the very least, RoboCop 3 works as a popcorn movie—something part two couldn't even manage."

Other points of criticism in this movie include curtailing the graphic violence of the first two films (deliberately done in order to be more family-friendly), less dark humor, and the absence of Peter Weller in the title role.

References

External links

 
 
 

1990s dystopian films
1990s science fiction action films
1990s superhero films
1993 films
1993 independent films
American films with live action and animation
American films about revenge
American independent films
American science fiction action films
American sequel films
American superhero films
Android (robot) films
Cyberpunk films
Cyborg films
1990s English-language films
Fictional portrayals of the Detroit Police Department
Films about amputees
Films adapted into comics
Films directed by Fred Dekker
Films scored by Basil Poledouris
Films set in Detroit
Films set in the future
Films shot in Atlanta
Films with screenplays by Frank Miller (comics)
Japan in non-Japanese culture
Orion Pictures films
RoboCop (franchise)
Techno-thriller films
1990s American films